Jeníkovice is name of several locations in the Czech Republic:

 Jeníkovice (Hradec Králové District), a village in the Hradec Králové district
 Jeníkovice (Pardubice District), a village in the Pardubice District in Pardubice Region